Charles Hallows (4 April 1895 – 10 November 1972) was an English first-class cricketer who played for Lancashire and England.

A tall left-handed opening batsman, Hallows provided the attacking flair in the successful Lancashire side in the 1920s. In the County Championship-winning years of 1927 and 1928, he was among the top half-dozen batsmen in England and his career average was more than 40 runs per innings. Yet he played only twice for England, once in 1921 and then again once in the inaugural Tests against the West Indies in 1928, scoring 42 runs in all and being dismissed only once. He was also a fine fieldsman with a superb throw.

In 1928, Hallows scored more than 1,000 runs in the month of May, a feat previously achieved only by W. G. Grace and Wally Hammond and never since.  He needed 232 runs to complete 1,000 in his last innings in May. He made that score and was out the next ball. But within four years, he had drifted out of the Lancashire team at the age of 37, taking up a series of professional appointments with league cricket clubs in England, Scotland, Ireland and Wales.

He coached at Merchant Taylors' Boys' School, Crosby, Belvedere College, Dublin, and Kimberley High School in South Africa, before being appointed coach at Worcestershire in 1957. He later took up the same role at Lancashire, retiring at the age of 74 in 1969. David Lloyd says that he was headhunted by the county.

He was a Wisden Cricketer of the Year in 1928.

References

External links
 
 Charlie Hallows at CricketArchive

English cricketers
England Test cricketers
Lancashire cricketers
Wisden Cricketers of the Year
People from Little Lever
1895 births
1972 deaths
Players cricketers
North v South cricketers
English cricketers of 1919 to 1945
English cricket coaches
Faculty of Belvedere College